Rosseau is an unincorporated community in Morgan County, in the U.S. state of Ohio.

History
Rosseau was laid out around 1836. A post office was established at Rosseau in 1837, and remained in operation until 1911.

References

Unincorporated communities in Morgan County, Ohio
Unincorporated communities in Ohio
1836 establishments in Ohio